Pheasant Hills was a provincial electoral district  for the Legislative Assembly of the province of Saskatchewan, Canada, centered just north of the town of Grenfell. This district was one of 25 created before the 1st Saskatchewan general election in 1905.

Originally named "Grenfell", this constituency was renamed Pheasant Hills in 1908, after a range of hills north of the Qu'Appelle River valley near Grenfell, Saskatchewan. The district was abolished before the 9th Saskatchewan general election in 1938 into Saltcoats and Melville.

It is now part of the constituencies of Moosomin, Last Mountain-Touchwood, and Melville-Saltcoats.

Members of the Legislative Assembly

Election results

|-
 
|style="width: 130px"|Provincial Rights
|Andrew William Argue
|align="right"|691
|align="right"|51.72%
|align="right"|–

|- bgcolor="white"
!align="left" colspan=3|Total
!align="right"|1,336
!align="right"|100.00%
!align="right"|

|-
 
|style="width: 130px"|Provincial Rights
|Henry Hayes Willway
|align="right"|828
|align="right"|56.95%
|align="right"|+5.23

|- bgcolor="white"
!align="left" colspan=3|Total
!align="right"|1,454
!align="right"|100.00%
!align="right"|

|-

 
|Conservative
|Henry Hayes Willway
|align="right"|831
|align="right"|42.10%
|align="right"|-14.85
|- bgcolor="white"
!align="left" colspan=3|Total
!align="right"|1,974
!align="right"|100.00%
!align="right"|

|-

 
|Conservative
|William C. Arnold
|align="right"|1,098
|align="right"|31.25%
|align="right"|-10.85
|- bgcolor="white"
!align="left" colspan=3|Total
!align="right"|3,514
!align="right"|100.00%
!align="right"|

|-

|Independent
|Hugh Wallace Lindsay
|align="right"|1,052
|align="right"|30.62%
|align="right"|–

|Independent
|William Howland Blyth
|align="right"|794
|align="right"|23.11%
|align="right"|–
|- bgcolor="white"
!align="left" colspan=3|Total
!align="right"|3,436
!align="right"|100.00%
!align="right"|

|-

|Independent
|Samuel Howard Potter
|align="right"|1,890
|align="right"|47.64%
|align="right"|-
|- bgcolor="white"
!align="left" colspan=3|Total
!align="right"|3,967
!align="right"|100.00%
!align="right"|

|-

|Independent
|John William Redgwick
|align="right"|2,650
|align="right"|46.85%
|align="right"|-0.79
|- bgcolor="white"
!align="left" colspan=3|Total
!align="right"|5,657
!align="right"|100.00%
!align="right"|

|-

|Farmer-Labour
|H.J. Benson
|align="right"|1,804
|align="right"|24.13%
|align="right"|–
 
|Conservative
|Chris Ness
|align="right"|1,363
|align="right"|18.23%
|align="right"|-
|- bgcolor="white"
!align="left" colspan=3|Total
!align="right"|7,477
!align="right"|100.00%
!align="right"|

See also 
Grenfell – Northwest Territories territorial electoral district (1870–1905).

Electoral district (Canada)
List of Saskatchewan provincial electoral districts
List of Saskatchewan general elections
List of political parties in Saskatchewan
Grenfell, Saskatchewan

References 
 Saskatchewan Archives Board – Saskatchewan Election Results By Electoral Division

Former provincial electoral districts of Saskatchewan